FK Khazar Sumgayit was an Azerbaijani football club.

History 
Founded in 1960, under the name of Metallurq, the club during its history changed their name 9 times and gained twice second place in Azerbaijan Premier League. In 2004, club liquidated due financial problems.

1960 m. – Metallurg
1961 m. – Temp
1963 m. – Himik
1964 m. – Polad
1974 m. – Hazar
1987 m. – Voshod
1988 m. – Hazar
1992 m. – Khazar
1997 m. – FK Sumqayıt
1998 m. – Kimyaçı
2001 m. – Khazar

League and domestic cup history

References

External links 
 Football club's profile  on www.foot.dk
 Football club's profile on www.soccerway.com
 Khazar Sumqayit on national-football-teams.com

Khazar Sumgayit
Association football clubs established in 1960
Defunct football clubs in Azerbaijan
Association football clubs disestablished in 2004